Giorgos Naoum (born 21 April 2001) is a Cypriot professional footballer who plays as an attacking midfielder for Cypriot club AEK Larnaca.

Club career

Early career 
Born in Strovolos, Cyprus, Naoum grew up in the Antonis Naoum Football Academy. He then played youth football for APOEL Nicosia. On 28 February 2019, Naoum joined the primavera (under-19) team of Padova in Italy.

AEK Larnaca 
He moved to Cypriot First Division club AEK Larnaca in summer 2019; Naoum sustained an ACL injury in November, and was sidelined for six months. He played nine league games in the 2020–21 season. In May 2021, Naoum's contract was extended until summer 2024.

International career 
Naoum represented Cyprus at under-17 level, scoring a goal (against Denmark) in 11 games. He also played for the Cyprus under-21 team at the 2023 UEFA European Under-21 Championship qualification.

Personal life 
Naoum is a Maronite Christian. He took part in mandatory military service while playing football.

Career statistics

Club

References

External links
 Profile at the Cyprus Football Association

2001 births
Living people
Cypriot Christians
Maronites
People from Nicosia District
Cypriot footballers
Association football midfielders
APOEL FC players
Calcio Padova players
AEK Larnaca FC players
Cypriot First Division players
Cyprus youth international footballers
Cyprus under-21 international footballers